Baghuiyeh (also Romanized as Bāghūīyeh; also known as Bāghūeeyeh) is a village in Fathabad Rural District, in the Central District of Baft County, Kerman Province, Iran. At the 2006 census, its population was 24, in 7 families.

References 

Populated places in Baft County